The Bahmani tombs at Bidar are the tombs of the Bahmani dynasty.

The Bahmani tombs are often confused with the Barid Shahi tombs, but while the former lies 4 km West of the town center at a place called Ashtur, the latter lies within the town.

History 
The tombs were erected from 1436 to 1535.

Architecture 
There are eight tombs of the Bahmani rulers. The inscriptions of the tomb reveal the name of the king, his date of accession, and date of death. Persian poetry and Quranic verses are also inscribed.

Tomb of Ahmed Shah 
The interior tomb of Ahmed Shah is decorated with frescoes.

Tomb of Humayun Shah 
The larger part tomb of Humayun Shah was destroyed by lightning.

Tomb of Sultan Kalim-ullah
The Sultan Kalim-ullah was the last Bahmani ruler, a puppet monarch under the control of his prime minister Amir Barid. The tomb was built after his death in 1527.

Tomb of Shah Rukh Khan
The tomb of Shah Rukh Khan is located to the North of Mahmud Shah's tomb. Historians believe he was a scion of the Bahmani dynasty, as only royal family members are buried here. The Ayat Al-Kursi is inscribed over the eastern doorway.

Chaukhandi

The Chaukhand is situated about a kilometer west of the main tomb complex. It is the tomb of Khalil-ullah Kirmani, a Sufi saint and spiritual advisor to Ahmed Shah.

References

Citations

Bibliography 

 

Bidar
Tombs in Karnataka
Bahmani architecture